The Beizhen Catholic Church is a Roman Catholic church in Beizhen, Liaoning, China.

History 
The church was originally built by French missionary Yi Ruohan in 1886.

In October 2014, it was inscribed as provincial cultural relic preservation organ by the Liaoning government.

Architecture 
The church is located in the north and faces the south.

References 

Roman Catholic churches completed in 1886
Churches in Liaoning
Tourist attractions in Beizhen
1886 establishments in China
19th-century Roman Catholic church buildings in China